Tamás Simon (1935–1956) was a Hungarian-Jewish poet and playwright. He is known for his verse drama A zsidó Don Juan, written in the mid-1950s.

Simon committed suicide by intentional drug overdose in 1956.

References

Bibliography
 

1935 births
1956 suicides
20th-century Hungarian dramatists and playwrights
Hungarian male dramatists and playwrights
Holocaust survivors
Jewish dramatists and playwrights
Jewish poets
Jewish Hungarian-language writers
Hungarian male poets
20th-century Hungarian poets
Drug-related suicides in Hungary